Conflict may refer to:

Arts, entertainment, and media

Films 
Conflict (1921 film), an American silent film directed by Stuart Paton
 Conflict (1936 film), an American boxing film starring John Wayne
 Conflict (1937 film), a Swedish drama film directed by Per-Axel Branner
 Conflict (1938 film), a French drama film directed by Léonide Moguy
 Conflict (1945 film), an American suspense film starring Humphrey Bogart
 Catholics: A Fable (1973 film), or The Conflict, a film starring Martin Sheen
 Judith (1966 film) or Conflict, a film starring Sophia Loren
 Samar (1999 film) or Conflict, a 1999 Indian film by Shyam Benegal

Games 
 Conflict (series), a 2002–2008 series of war games for the PS2, Xbox, and PC
 Conflict (video game), a 1989 Nintendo Entertainment System war game
 Conflict: Middle East Political Simulator, a 1990 strategy computer game

Literature and periodicals
 Conflict (novel), a 1934 novel by E.V. Timms
Conflict, an underground art fanzine by Gerard Cosloy
 Conflict, an adventure pulp magazine from 1933 to 1934 that published a story by Margie Harris
 Conflict, a wargame magazine that included board wargames

Music 
 Conflict (band), an anarcho-punk band
 Conflict (Sy Smith album), a 2008 R&B album
 Conflict (Jimmy Woods album), a 1963 jazz album
 "Conflict", a song by Disturbed from the 2000 album The Sickness

Television 
 Conflict (1978 TV series), a TVB television series
 Conflict (American TV series), a 1956 American television series
 "Conflict" (UFO), the fourth episode aired of the first series of UFO

Other uses in arts, entertainment, and media
 Conflict (narrative), a core literary element

Military 
 Violence
 Armed conflict, often known as war
 HMS Conflict, a list of ships with the name
 HMS Conflict (1873), a schooner launched in 1873 and sold in 1882
 HMS Conflict (1894), a Conflict-class destroyer launched in 1894 and sold in 1920

Social science
 Conflict (process), the general pattern of groups dealing with disparate ideas
 Conflict continuum from cooperation (low intensity), to contest, to higher intensity (violence and war)  
 Conflict of interest, involvement in multiple interests which could possibly corrupt the motivation or decision-making
 Cultural conflict, a type of conflict that occurs when different cultural values and beliefs clash
 Ethnic conflict, a conflict between two or more contending ethnic groups
 Group conflict, conflict between groups
 Intragroup conflict, conflict within groups
 Organizational conflict, discord caused by opposition of needs, values, and interests between people working together
 Role conflict, incompatible demands placed upon a person such that compliance with both would be difficult
 Social conflict, the struggle for agency or power in something
 Work–family conflict, incompatible demands between the work and family roles of an individual

Other uses 
 Conflict (air traffic control), a loss of separation between two aircraft
 Conflict (revision control), a computer problem wherein multiple editors attempt to edit the same document

See also 

 
 
 
 
  Clash (disambiguation)
 Conflict resolution
 Confrontation (disambiguation)
 Struggle (disambiguation)